Hamza is a city in Hamza District, Al-Qādisiyyah Governorate, Iraq. It is located about 25 km south of Al Diwaniyah and 175 km south of Baghdad on the Diwaniya Channel branch of the Euphrates). Its name is attributed to Bahraini Shia cleric "Ahmad Ibn Hashim Al-Ghurifi" (a.k.a. Hamza), who was killed and buried in the region, whose shrine resides in the city. It is predominantly Shia Arab. The main tribes are Jubur, Khazali, Salameh, Aerdh, and Alakra.

References

Cities in Iraq
Populated places along the Silk Road
Populated places on the Euphrates River